Elizabeth Maxwell is an American voice actress. She is best known for her roles as Ymir in Attack on Titan, Winter Schnee in RWBY, Urbosa in The Legend of Zelda: Breath of the Wild, Rosaria in Genshin Impact, and Caulifla in Dragon Ball Super.

Career 
Maxwell began her acting career in short web films, the first being, Living Like Fire (2004). She then moved on to bigger projects like 201 Hells (2008), which was her debut anime dub. She would later appear as Abby in the television show Criminal Minds. Nearly five years later in 2013, she played Ymir in Attack on Titan and the parody show Attack on Titan: Junior High in 2015.

Filmography

Anime

Film

Video games

Web shows

Awards

References

External links

Living people
American voice actresses
21st-century American actresses
Year of birth missing (living people)